André Kimbuta Yango (born 16 June 1954 in Kikwit, Kwilu District) is a Congolese politician and a former Governor of Kinshasa.

The Boteti affair
Daniel Boteti, the Vice-President of the Provincial Assembly of Kinshasa, was murdered on July 6, 2008. Patrick Mwewa, who was along with five others charged with the killing, alleged before a military tribunal on July 18 that Yango had ordered Boteti's death, offering Mwewa $1,200 to take part in the murder. Kimbuta's spokesperson Therese Olenga said that the testimony was filled with "contradictions".

References

1954 births
Living people
People from Kikwit
Governors of Kinshasa
Governors of provinces of the Democratic Republic of the Congo
21st-century Democratic Republic of the Congo people